The 1977 East Coast Conference men's basketball tournament was held March 1–6, 1977.  The champion gained and an automatic berth to the NCAA tournament.

Bracket and results

* denotes overtime game

References

East Coast Conference (Division I) men's basketball tournament
Tournament